Mother Rita Barcelo y Pages  (20 April 1843 - 14 May 1904) was the Spanish Foundress of the Augustinian Sisters of Our Lady of Consolation and sister of the Venerable Consuelo Barcelo y Pages, who was the cofounder of the said order. She is currently nominated for the cause of sainthood.

Canonization
After Mother Consuelo was given the title of a "Venerable" in December 2012, the Congregation for the Causes of Saints announced already a close opening for the process of Mother Rita, making her way to sainthood which shall only need a miracle to continue onwards. Her cause for sainthood was proposed by the Augustinians and of the Congregation of the Augustinian Sisters. Today she is commemorated as a "Servant of God" within the Roman Catholic Church.

References

External links
 Mother Rita Barcelo Y Pages, OSA at Augustinian Sisters of Our Lady of Consolation
 Hagiography Circle

1843 births
1904 deaths
Augustinian nuns
Spanish Servants of God
Filipino Servants of God
20th-century venerated Christians
20th-century Spanish nuns
People from Barcelona
19th-century Spanish nuns